Pennsylvania Route 505 (PA 505) is a  state highway located in northwest Pennsylvania. The route is a continuation of PA 97 along the Perry Highway and ends at U.S. Route 20 (US 20) in Erie as Glenwood Park Avenue.

Route description

PA 505 is a continuation of the Perry Highway from PA 97 in Millcreek Township. In the suburbs of the city of Erie, PA 505 runs northward as Perry Highway (named for Oliver Hazard Perry, hero of the Battle of Lake Erie) and Glenwood Park Avenue through residential areas, between PA 97 and US 19. In Glenwood Park, the route passes by the Erie Zoo, running towards downtown Erie. North of the park, the highway runs through residential areas and ends in the downtown district of the city, at an intersection with US 20.

History
PA 505 was formed in the late 1920s along what is now the northernmost segment of PA 97. By 1940, the route was moved to its current designation.

Major intersections

See also

References

External links

Pennsylvania Highways: PA 505

505
Transportation in Erie County, Pennsylvania